El Alto is a corregimiento in Santa Fé District, Veraguas Province, Panama with a population of 1,318 as of 2010. Its population as of 1990 was 2,242; its population as of 2000 was 2,060.

References

Corregimientos of Veraguas Province